Ray Barrett (born 24 January 1935 – 25 March 2016) was an Australian rules footballer who played with St Kilda in the Victorian Football League (VFL).

Notes

External links 

1935 births
2016 deaths
Australian rules footballers from Victoria (Australia)
St Kilda Football Club players